Episimus brunneomarginatus is a species of moth of the family Tortricidae. It is found in Ecuador (Morona-Santiago Province and Napo Province).

The ground colour of the forewings is cinnamon, suffused with greyish in some areas and with brown along the costa. The hindwings are pale brownish, but more cream basally.

Etymology
The species name refers to the dark brown stripe parallel to the forewing hind margin.

References

External links

Moths described in 2006
Endemic fauna of Ecuador
Olethreutini
Moths of South America
Taxa named by Józef Razowski